Timothy Julien Durwael (born 24 February 1991) is a Belgian footballer who plays as a right-back for Belgian Division 2 club Houtvenne.

Club career
Born in Hasselt, Durwael began his career with Sporting Hasselt. After this spell, he joined Genk. He made his first team debut for Genk on 30 August 2009, in a 1-1 draw against Germinal Beerschot.

Durwael decided to retire at the end of 2020. In 2021, he came out of retirement to join Belgian Division 2 club Houtvenne.

International career
Durwael was an Under-18, an Under-19 and Under-21  international for Belgium.

Honours
Genk
 Belgian Pro League: 2010–11
 Belgian Super Cup: 2011

References

External links
 
 UEFA International Stats
 
 Voetbal International profile 

1991 births
Living people
Belgian footballers
Association football defenders
Association football midfielders
K.R.C. Genk players
FC Eindhoven players
KFC Turnhout players
Roda JC Kerkrade players
Eerste Divisie players
Belgian Pro League players
Belgian expatriate footballers
Expatriate footballers in the Netherlands
Belgian expatriate sportspeople in the Netherlands
Sportspeople from Hasselt
Footballers from Limburg (Belgium)
KFC Houtvenne players
21st-century Belgian people